In probability theory, Kolmogorov's Three-Series Theorem, named after Andrey Kolmogorov, gives a criterion for the almost sure convergence of an infinite series of random variables in terms of the convergence of three different series involving properties of their probability distributions. Kolmogorov's three-series theorem, combined with Kronecker's lemma, can be used to give a relatively easy proof of the Strong Law of Large Numbers.

Statement of the theorem 

Let  be independent random variables.

Proof

Sufficiency of conditions ("if") 

Condition (i) and Borel–Cantelli give that  for  large, almost surely. Hence  converges if and only if  converges.

Necessity of conditions ("only if") 

Suppose that  converges almost surely.

Without condition (i), by Borel–Cantelli there would exist some  such that  for infinitely many , almost surely. But then the series would diverge. Therefore, we must have condition (i).

Thus, it only remains to demonstrate the necessity of condition (iii), and we will have obtained the full result. It is equivalent to check condition (iii) for the series
So we wish to check that if  converges, then  converges as well. This is a special case of a more general result from martingale theory with summands equal to the increments of a martingale sequence and the same conditions (the series of the variances is converging; and the summands are bounded).

Example 
As an illustration of the theorem, consider the example of the harmonic series with random signs:
 
With  the summands of the first two series are identically zero and var(Yn)=. The conditions of the theorem are then satisfied, so it follows that the harmonic series with random signs converges almost surely. On the other hand, the analogous series of (for example) square root reciprocals with random signs, namely
 

diverges almost surely, since condition (3) in the theorem is not satisfied for any A. Note that this is different from the behavior of the analogous series with alternating signs, which does converge.

Notes

Mathematical series
Probability theorems